Ronald or Ron Warner may refer to:
Ron Warner (American football) (born 1979), American football player
Ron Warner (baseball) (born 1968), American baseball player and manager
Ronnie Warner, American actor, producer and writer